Locomotive Games, Inc. (formerly known as Pacific Coast Power & Light) was an American video game company based in Santa Clara, California. The studio was owned by THQ, the studio developed games for a variety of game machines and consoles, while also working on several of THQ's major licenses and franchises.

History 
The company was founded in December 1997 as Don Traeger Productions Inc. (with the trade name DT Productions) by Don Traeger (founder of EA Sports and BMG Interactive) and Dennis Harper (former executive of Atari Games).

The company was acquired by THQ in 1999 for a total of $13 million. The studio was renamed to Locomotive Games in April 2005. The company was closed by THQ in 2008.

List of games

As Pacific Coast Power & Light

As Locomotive Games

References

THQ
Defunct video game companies of the United States
Video game companies established in 1997
Video game companies disestablished in 2008
Video game development companies